The 1998–99 NBA season was the Raptors' fourth season in the National Basketball Association. On March 23, 1998, the owners of all 29 NBA teams voted 27–2 to reopen the league's collective bargaining agreement, seeking changes to the league's salary cap system, and a ceiling on individual player salaries. The National Basketball Players Association (NBPA) opposed to the owners' plan, and wanted raises for players who earned the league's minimum salary. After both sides failed to reach an agreement, the owners called for a lockout, which began on July 1, 1998, putting a hold on all team trades, free agent signings and training camp workouts, and cancelling many NBA regular season and preseason games. Due to the lockout, the NBA All-Star Game, which was scheduled to be played in Philadelphia on February 14, 1999, was also cancelled. However, on January 6, 1999, NBA commissioner David Stern, and NBPA director Billy Hunter finally reached an agreement to end the lockout. The deal was approved by both the players and owners, and was signed on January 20, ending the lockout after 204 days. The regular season began on February 5, and was cut short to just 50 games instead of the regular 82-game schedule.

In the 1998 NBA draft, the Raptors selected Antawn Jamison from the University of North Carolina with the fourth overall pick, but soon traded him to the Golden State Warriors in exchange for his college teammate Vince Carter, who is also second-year star Tracy McGrady's cousin. During the off-season, the team acquired Charles Oakley from the New York Knicks, acquired Kevin Willis from the Houston Rockets, and signed free agent Michael Stewart.

During the regular season, the Raptors moved into their new arena Air Canada Centre. With the addition of Carter, the Raptors posted a 4–8 record in February. After a 6–12 start, the Raptors played their best basketball winning 12 of their next 14 games, while posting their first monthly winning record at 11–6 in March. However, they lost 13 of their final 18 games and finished the season with a 23–27 record, sixth in the Central Division.

Carter averaged 18.3 points, 5.7 rebounds and 1.5 blocks per game, and was named Rookie of the Year, and selected to the NBA All-Rookie First Team. In addition, Doug Christie averaged 15.2 points and 2.3 steals per game, while Willis provided the team with 12.0 points and 8.3 rebounds per game, and sixth man Dee Brown contributed 11.2 points per game off the bench, and led the league with 135 three-point field goals. McGrady averaged 9.3 points and 5.7 rebounds per game also off the bench, while Oakley averaged 7.0 points and 7.5 rebounds per game, John Wallace contributed 8.6 points per game off the bench, and second-year guard Alvin Williams contributed 5.0 points and 2.6 assists per game.

Following the season, Wallace re-signed as a free agent with his former team, the New York Knicks, and Reggie Slater was released to free agency.

Offseason
 June 25, 1998 – The Raptors trade Marcus Camby to the New York Knicks in exchange for Charles Oakley.
 January 21, 1999 – The Raptors trade Chauncey Billups to the Denver Nuggets for the Nuggets first-round pick in the 1999 NBA draft.

NBA Draft
Carter was drafted by the NBA's Golden State Warriors 5th overall and then traded to the Toronto Raptors for Antawn Jamison, his UNC college teammate and best friend.

Roster

Regular season

Highs
 The Raptors played their final game at Skydome on February 19, 1999.
 The first Raptors game at Air Canada Centre took place on February 21, 1999, versus the Vancouver Grizzlies.

Season standings

Record vs. opponents

Game log

|- bgcolor="bbffbb"
| 1
| February 5
| @ Boston
| 
| Kevin Willis (28)
| Kevin Willis (16)
| Alvin Williams (6)
| FleetCenter17,892
| 1-0
|- bgcolor="ffcccc"
| 2
| February 6
| @ Washington
| 
| Charles Oakley (18)
| Charles Oakley (8)
| Alvin Williams (9)
| MCI Center19,335
| 1-1
|- bgcolor="ffcccc"
| 3
| February 9
| Milwaukee
| 
| Vince Carter (22)
| Charles Oakley, Kevin Willis (11)
| Dee Brown (6)
| Maple Leaf Gardens14,577
| 1-2
|- bgcolor="ffcccc"
| 4
| February 11
| @ Miami
| 
| Doug Christie (20)
| Michael Stewart (7)
| Doug Christie, Alvin Williams (3)
| Miami Arena14,832
| 1-3
|- bgcolor="ffcccc"
| 5
| February 16
| @ New York
| 
| Vince Carter (17)
| Charles Oakley (7)
| Doug Christie (4)
| Madison Square Garden19,763
| 1-4
|- bgcolor="ffcccc"
| 6
| February 18
| Washington
| 
| Kevin Willis (25)
| Kevin Willis (14)
| Doug Christie (6)
| SkyDome14,292
| 1-5
|- bgcolor="bbffbb"
| 7
| February 19
| Milwaukee
| 
| Doug Christie (20)
| Kevin Willis (11)
| Tracy McGrady (7)
| SkyDome14,888
| 2-5
|- bgcolor="bbffbb"
| 8
| February 21
| Vancouver
| 
| Vince Carter (27)
| Kevin Willis (15)
| Charles Oakley (6)
| Air Canada Centre19,800
| 3-5
|- bgcolor="ffcccc"
| 9
| February 23
| @ Detroit
| 
| John Wallace (14)
| Doug Christie, John Wallace (5)
| Doug Christie, Tracy McGrady (4)
| The Palace of Auburn Hills14,187
| 3-6
|- bgcolor="ffcccc"
| 10
| February 24
| @ Indiana
| 
| Vince Carter (28)
| Kevin Willis (13)
| Tracy McGrady (3)
| Market Square Arena14,700
| 3-7
|- bgcolor="bbffbb"
| 11
| February 26
| Minnesota
| 
| Vince Carter (21)
| Kevin Willis (16)
| Doug Christie (9)
| Air Canada Centre15,122
| 4-7
|- bgcolor="ffcccc"
| 12
| February 28
| Chicago
| 
| Kevin Willis (19)
| Charles Oakley (12)
| Dee Brown (7)
| Air Canada Centre14,173
| 4-8

|- bgcolor="ffcccc"
| 13
| March 1
| @ Charlotte
| 
| Dee Brown, Vince Carter, Doug Christie (15)
| John Wallace (10)
| Alvin Williams (6)
| Charlotte Coliseum18,039
| 4-9
|- bgcolor="bbffbb"
| 14
| March 4
| @ Atlanta
| 
| Dee Brown (16)
| Tracy McGrady, Charles Oakley (8)
| Doug Christie, Kevin Willis (4)
| Alexander Memorial Coliseum7,877
| 5-9
|- bgcolor="ffcccc"
| 15
| March 5
| Orlando
| 
| Kevin Willis (21)
| Kevin Willis (14)
| Tracy McGrady, Alvin Williams (6)
| Air Canada Centre15,601
| 5-10
|- bgcolor="bbffbb"
| 16
| March 7
| Boston
| 
| Vince Carter (26)
| Charles Oakley (13)
| Doug Christie (7)
| Air Canada Centre16,635
| 6-10
|- bgcolor="ffcccc"
| 17
| March 11
| @ Miami
| 
| John Wallace (20)
| John Wallace (7)
| Charles Oakley (3)
| Miami Arena14,911
| 6-11
|- bgcolor="ffcccc"
| 18
| March 13
| @ Atlanta
| 
| Doug Christie (21)
| Vince Carter (9)
| Doug Christie (4)
| Alexander Memorial Coliseum8,456
| 6-12
|- bgcolor="bbffbb"
| 19
| March 15
| Charlotte
| 
| Doug Christie (18)
| Charles Oakley (10)
| Doug Christie (5)
| Air Canada Centre15,329
| 7-12
|- bgcolor="bbffbb"
| 20
| March 16
| New Jersey
| 
| Vince Carter (20)
| Vince Carter (15)
| Dee Brown (5)
| Air Canada Centre15,731
| 8-12
|- bgcolor="bbffbb"
| 21
| March 17
| @ Detroit
| 
| Vince Carter (28)
| Tracy McGrady (7)
| Tracy McGrady (5)
| The Palace of Auburn Hills14,981
| 9-12
|- bgcolor="bbffbb"
| 22
| March 19
| L.A. Clippers
| 
| Vince Carter (26)
| Tracy McGrady (12)
| Dee Brown, Alvin Williams (5)
| Air Canada Centre18,839
| 10-12
|- bgcolor="bbffbb"
| 23
| March 21
| New York
| 
| Vince Carter (23)
| Vince Carter, Charles Oakley (12)
| Charles Oakley (4)
| Air Canada Centre19,266
| 11-12
|- bgcolor="ffcccc"
| 24
| March 22
| @ New Jersey
| 
| John Wallace (19)
| John Wallace (7)
| Vince Carter, Charles Oakley (3)
| Continental Airlines Arena14,697
| 11-13
|- bgcolor="bbffbb"
| 25
| March 23
| @ Chicago
| 
| Dee Brown (25)
| Vince Carter (11)
| Doug Christie (8)
| United Center22,236
| 12-13
|- bgcolor="ffcccc"
| 26
| March 25
| @ Houston
| 
| Vince Carter (32)
| Charles Oakley (8)
| Vince Carter (6)
| Compaq Center16,285
| 12-14
|- bgcolor="bbffbb"
| 27
| March 26
| @ San Antonio
| 
| Dee Brown (23)
| Charles Oakley, Kevin Willis (7)
| Doug Christie, Charles Oakley (5)
| Alamodome16,290
| 13-14
|- bgcolor="bbffbb"
| 28
| March 28
| Chicago
| 
| Vince Carter (22)
| Charles Oakley (13)
| Doug Christie (6)
| Air Canada Centre18,461
| 14-14
|- bgcolor="bbffbb"
| 29
| March 30
| @ Cleveland
| 
| Dee Brown (28)
| Charles Oakley (11)
| Vince Carter, Tracy McGrady (6)
| Gund Arena14,209
| 15-14

|- bgcolor="bbffbb"
| 30
| April 1
| Indiana
| 
| Vince Carter (31)
| Vince Carter (11)
| Alvin Williams (8)
| Air Canada Centre18,666
| 16-14
|- bgcolor="bbffbb"
| 31
| April 3
| Washington
| 
| Kevin Willis (22)
| Kevin Willis (11)
| Vince Carter, Doug Christie, Charles Oakley (4)
| Air Canada Centre18,929
| 17-14
|- bgcolor="bbffbb"
| 32
| April 4
| Philadelphia
| 
| Doug Christie (22)
| Kevin Willis (11)
| Doug Christie, Charles Oakley, Kevin Willis (4)
| Air Canada Centre18,462
| 18-14
|- bgcolor="ffcccc"
| 33
| April 6
| Miami
| 
| Tracy McGrady, John Wallace (12)
| Tracy McGrady (10)
| Dee Brown (4)
| Air Canada Centre19,209
| 18-15
|- bgcolor="ffcccc"
| 34
| April 8
| Boston
| 
| Vince Carter (31)
| Kevin Willis (10)
| Tracy McGrady, Charles Oakley (5)
| Air Canada Centre16,949
| 18-16
|- bgcolor="ffcccc"
| 35
| April 9
| @ New Jersey
| 
| Vince Carter (26)
| Kevin Willis (15)
| Dee Brown (6)
| Continental Airlines Arena15,764
| 18-17
|- bgcolor="ffcccc"
| 36
| April 12
| Indiana
| 
| Vince Carter (29)
| Kevin Willis (19)
| Doug Christie (8)
| Air Canada Centre19,427
| 18-18
|- bgcolor="ffcccc"
| 37
| April 14
| @ Philadelphia
| 
| Doug Christie (19)
| Kevin Willis (10)
| Dee Brown, Charles Oakley (4)
| First Union Center17,474
| 18-19
|- bgcolor="ffcccc"
| 38
| April 16
| Cleveland
| 
| Doug Christie (22)
| Vince Carter (12)
| Vince Carter (8)
| Air Canada Centre19,280
| 18-20
|- bgcolor="bbffbb"
| 39
| April 17
| @ New York
| 
| Vince Carter (21)
| Kevin Willis (10)
| Charles Oakley (6)
| Madison Square Garden19,763
| 19-20
|- bgcolor="bbffbb"
| 40
| April 19
| Orlando
| 
| Tracy McGrady, Kevin Willis (16)
| Tracy McGrady (11)
| Alvin Williams (5)
| Air Canada Centre17,715
| 20-20
|- bgcolor="ffcccc"
| 41
| April 20
| Atlanta
| 
| Vince Carter (16)
| Kevin Willis (8)
| Dee Brown (5)
| Air Canada Centre18,439
| 20-21
|- bgcolor="bbffbb"
| 42
| April 21
| @ Washington
| 
| Doug Christie (28)
| Charles Oakley (9)
| Doug Christie (7)
| MCI Center12,214
| 21-21
|- bgcolor="bbffbb"
| 43
| April 23
| @ Orlando
| 
| Vince Carter (24)
| Tracy McGrady (8)
| Dee Brown (4)
| Orlando Arena17,248
| 22-21
|- bgcolor="ffcccc"
| 44
| April 25
| Detroit
| 
| Vince Carter (18)
| Kevin Willis (7)
| Vince Carter (8)
| Air Canada Centre19,800
| 22-22
|- bgcolor="ffcccc"
| 45
| April 27
| Charlotte
| 
| Tracy McGrady (27)
| Charles Oakley (10)
| Charles Oakley (5)
| Air Canada Centre19,800
| 22-23
|- bgcolor="ffcccc"
| 46
| April 28
| @ Milwaukee
| 
| Dee Brown (29)
| Vince Carter (7)
| Doug Christie (5)
| Bradley Center15,463
| 22-24
|- bgcolor="ffcccc"
| 47
| April 30
| @ Cleveland
| 
| Vince Carter (25)
| Tracy McGrady (13)
| Vince Carter (5)
| Gund Arena13,958
| 22-25

|- bgcolor="ffcccc"
| 48
| May 1
| @ Philadelphia
| 
| Doug Christie (27)
| John Wallace (8)
| Charles Oakley (6)
| First Union Center20,550
| 22-26
|- bgcolor="ffcccc"
| 49
| May 4
| @ Milwaukee
| 
| Vince Carter (26)
| Tracy McGrady, Reggie Slater (6)
| Charles Oakley (5)
| Bradley Center13,859
| 22-27
|- bgcolor="bbffbb"
| 50
| May 5
| Cleveland
| 
| Doug Christie (26)
| John Thomas (11)
| Tracy McGrady, Charles Oakley (7)
| Air Canada Centre19,800
| 23-27

Player statistics

Regular season

Award winners
 Vince Carter, NBA Rookie of the Year
 Vince Carter, NBA All-Rookie First Team

References

External links
 1998–99 Toronto Raptors season at Basketball Reference
 1998–99 Toronto Raptors season at Database Basketball

Toronto Raptors seasons
Toronto
Toronto Raptors
Toronto Raptors
Tor